John Bulmer (1784 - 1857) was an Independent minister. He was born and grew up in Yorkshire, England, and was  educated for the Congregational Ministry at Rotherham (Masborough) Independent College. He moved to Wales as pastor of Albany Meeting House, Haverfordwest in 1813. Whilst there he worked on and published a number of volumes of verse, sermons, and other religious material.

In 1840 he left Haverfordwest for a position in Rugeley. He held further ministerial positions in Bristol, Newbury, and (after an interval) at Langmore and Ruxton near Ross.

He died in 1857.

References 

Welsh Protestant religious leaders
1784 births
1857 deaths
19th-century Welsh clergy
19th-century English clergy